Born to Kill? is a British true crime television series, made by Twofour Productions. Each episode is an in-depth look at the childhood, and formative years of serial killers in an attempt to find out whether the individuals were born killers, or created by the environments they found themselves in.

A book to accompany the series, How to Make a Serial Killer: The Twisted Development of Innocent Children, has been written by Christopher Berry-Dee and Steven Morris.

In 2013 TwoFour Productions sold the fifth series of Born to Kill? in Canada, the United States and Latin America.

In the show there were regular participants criminal psychologists/experts, like: Louis B Schlesinger, Helen Morrison, Katherine Ramsland, David Wilson and Robert Ressler.

Episodes

Season 1
 S01E01 Fred West
 S01E02 Harold Shipman
 S01E03 Jeffrey Dahmer
 S01E04 Myra Hindley
 S01E05 The Washington Snipers
 S01E06 Ivan Milat

Season 2
 S02E01 Ted Bundy
 S02E02 Charles Starkweather
 S02E03 John Wayne Gacy
 S02E04 Aileen Wuornos
 S02E05 Richard Chase
 S02E06 Albert DeSalvo

Season 3
 S03E01 Gary Ridgway
 S03E02 Edmund Kemper
 S03E03 Richard Ramirez
 S03E04 Donald Gaskins
 S03E05 David Berkowitz
 S03E06 Dennis Nilsen

Season 4
 S04E01 Charles Manson
 S04E02 Dennis Rader
 S04E03 Beverly Allitt
 S04E04 Hillside Stranglers (Kenneth Bianchi and Angelo Buono)
 S04E05 Colin Ireland
 S04E06 Herbert Mullin

Season 5
 S05E01 Peter Sutcliffe
 S05E02 Donald Nielson
 S05E03 Patrick Mackay
 S05E04 John Linley Frazier
 S05E05 Cary Stayner
 S05E06 The Briley Brothers
 S05E07 Hadden Clark
 S05E08 Paul Bernardo and Karla Homolka
 S05E09 Thor Christiansen
 S05E10 Dale Hausner and Samuel Dieteman
 S05E11 Wesley Shermantine and Loren Herzog
 S05E12 Douglas Clark and Carol Bundy

Season 6
 SE06E01 Robert Napper
 SE06E02 John Duffy and David Mulcahy
 SE06E03 Gerald and Charlene Gallego
 SE06E04 Levi Bellfield
 SE06E05 Tony Costa
 SE06E06 Richard Cottingham
 SE06E07 Cleophus Prince Jr.
 SE06E08 Sean Gillis
 SE06E09 Timothy Wilson Spencer
 SE06E10 David Alan Gore and Fred Waterfield
 SE06E11 David Carpenter
 SE06E12 Bobby Joe Long

Season 7
 SE07E01 Peter Moore
 SE07E02 Trevor Hardy
 SE07E03 William Suff
 SE07E04 Charles Albright
 SE07E05 Allan Legere
 SE07E06 Robert Reldan

Born to Kill? Class of Evil 
The series received a sequel in 2017.
As usual, one new killer is investigated in each episode, but this series delved into the extensive 'Born To Kill?' archive, to draw comparisons with some of the most infamous serial killers in history.
The new series lasted only one season.

Season 1
 SE01E01 Peter Tobin
 SE01E02 Altemio Sanchez
 SE01E03 Alton Coleman and Debra Brown
 SE01E04 Stephen Griffiths
 SE01E05 Graham Young
 SE01E06 Joanna Dennehy

Killing Spree
In 2014 TwoFour Productions started a new show named Killing Spree with the same crew and narrator. The show followed the same pattern as Born to Kill? by looking at their childhood and the police investigation after them. The only difference that they examine cases of spree and rampage killers rather than serial killers. The show lasted two seasons.

Season 1
 SE01E01 Suffolk Strangler
 SE01E02 Terror in Paradise
 SE01E03 Northumbria Rampage
 SE01E04 The Miami Murders
 SE01E05 Horror at the Mall
 SE01E06 Columbine Massacre

Season 2
 SE01E01 The Hungerford Massacre
 SE01E02 Soho Nail Bomber
 SE01E03 New York Knifings
 SE01E04 Revenge Cop Killer
 SE01E05 The Family Slayer
 SE01E06 Woman On The Rampage

Related programs
Crime Investigation Australia
Crimes That Shook the World
Most Evil Killers

References

External links
TwoFour website
Born to Kill on UK TV Play
Born To Kill? on IMDb.com

2016 British television series endings
True crime television series
2010s British documentary television series
British crime television series
2000s British documentary television series
2005 British television series debuts
Non-fiction works about serial killers
Television series about serial killers
Television series by ITV Studios